This is a list of the cattle breeds considered in India to be wholly or partly of Indian origin. Some may have complex or obscure histories, so inclusion here does not necessarily imply that a breed is predominantly or exclusively Indian. Cows from these breeds are often called Desi cows.

Indigenous breeds

See also 
 Indian Agricultural Research Institute (IARI)
 Indigenous cattle breeds of India
 Central Institute for Research on Buffaloes (CIRB, Hisar)
 Government Livestock Farm, Hisar (GLF, Hisar)
 National Dairy Research Institute (NDRI, Karnal)
 List of water buffalo breeds

References

 
Cattle